Orthaga cryptochalcis is a species of snout moth, family Pyralidae. It was described by Joseph de Joannis in 1927. It is found in Mozambique.

References

Epipaschiinae
Moths of Sub-Saharan Africa
Lepidoptera of Mozambique
Endemic fauna of Mozambique
Moths described in 1927
Taxa named by Joseph de Joannis